Emperor Wu of Southern Qi (南齊武帝) (440– 27 August 493), personal name Xiao Ze (蕭賾), courtesy name Xuanyuan (宣遠), childhood name Long'er (龍兒), was the second emperor of the Chinese Southern Qi dynasty. He is generally considered to be an able and diligent emperor, although he is also criticized for leading a lavish lifestyle.

Background 

Xiao Ze was born in the Liu Song capital Jiankang in 440, when his father Xiao Daocheng was just 13 years old.  He was the oldest son of his father, and his mother Liu Zhirong was Xiao Daocheng's wife.

By 466, when Xiao Daocheng was a Liu Song general, Xiao Ze was a county magistrate at Gan County (贛縣, in modern Ganzhou, Jiangsi), when he was stuck in the civil war between Emperor Ming, whose claim his father Xiao Daocheng supported, and Emperor Ming's nephew Liu Zixun, who also claimed the throne.  Because of Xiao Daocheng's support for Emperor Ming, Xiao Ze, who was deep in the territory controlled by Liu Zixun, was arrested and imprisoned.  His associate Huan Kang fled with Xiao Ze's wife Pei Huizhao and his two sons Xiao Zhangmao and Xiao Ziliang, and then organized some 100 people, along with Xiao Ze's distant relative Xiao Xinzu, to make a surprise attack on Gan and rescue Xiao Ze.  Xiao Ze then started an uprising at Gan against Liu Zixun.  After Liu Zixun was defeated later that year, for Xiao Ze's contributions, Emperor Ming created him the Viscount of Gan, but he declined.

In 477, after Xiao Daocheng assassinated Emperor Ming's violent and arbitrary son and successor Emperor Houfei, the general Shen Youzhi, from his base of Jing Province (荊州, modern central and western Hubei), started a campaign against Xiao Daocheng.  At that time, Xiao Ze, who had just previously been the chief of staff for Emperor Houfei's brother Liu Xie the governor of Ying Province (郢州, modern eastern Hubei), was returning to Jiankang with Liu Xie.  He had reached Xunyang (尋陽, in modern Jiujiang, Jiangxi) when news of Shen's uprising arrived.  His associates all recommending speeding back to the capital Jiankang, but Xiao Ze instead took up defense position at Pencou (湓口, also in modern Jiujiang) to block the Yangtze River in anticipation of Shen's advancing east.  When Xiao Daocheng received Xiao Ze's report, he gladly stated, "He is really my son!"  (As it turned out, the defense was not needed, as Shen became mired in his siege of Yingcheng (郢城, in modern Wuhan, Hubei), and eventually his forces collapsed when he could not capture Yingcheng quickly, but Xiao Ze's tactical setup would have provided additional difficulty for Shen had he advanced further.)  Xiao Ze was subsequently created the Marquess of Wenxi, and then the Duke of Wenxi, as his father progressed toward taking the throne.  In 479, after Xiao Daocheng took the throne from Emperor Shun, ending Liu Song and establishing Southern Qi as its Emperor Gao, Xiao Ze was created the crown prince.

As crown prince 

As crown prince, Xiao Ze was often involved in the important matters of state.  In 479, for example, when the official Xie Duo publicly displayed refusal to submit to Emperor Gao after he took the throne, Xiao Ze suggested that Emperor Gao execute Xie to warn others, but Emperor Gao refused, instead finding another excuse to remove Xie.

In 480, Xiao Ze's wife, Crown Princess Pei Huizhao, died.  He would not have a wife after that point, although he had a multitude of concubines.

Because Xiao Ze was only 13 years younger than his father Emperor Gao, and he felt that he contributed greatly to the establishment of Southern Qi, he often interjected himself into governmental matters, and he often used items that were properly only usable by the emperor.  He also trusted his jester Zhang Jingzhen, who was so luxurious in his lifestyle to be like an emperor.  When the official Xun Boyu reported this to Emperor Gao while Xiao Ze happened to be away from the capital Jiankang to worship the ancestors, Emperor Gao was enraged.  Xiao Ze's brother Xiao Ni the Prince of Yuzhang found this out and quickly rode on a horse to personally warn Xiao Ze.  Xiao Ze quickly returned to Jiankang, and the next day, Emperor Gao sent Xiao Ze's two sons, Xiao Zhangmao the Prince of Nan Commandery and Xiao Ziliang the Duke of Wenxi, to rebuke Xiao Ze for him and to order Zhang put to death in Xiao Ze's name.  It took about a month for Emperor Gao's furor to subside, after a feast organized by the official Wang Jingze at the crown prince's palace.  For some time, however, Emperor Gao considered replacing Xiao Ze as crown prince with Xiao Ni, but because Xiao Ni continued to serve his brother faithfully and carefully, their brotherly relations were not affected.

In 482, Emperor Gao died, and Xiao Ze took the throne as Emperor Wu.

Early reign 
Immediately after taking the throne, Emperor Wu posthumously honored his wife Crown Princess Pei as Empress Mu, and he created his oldest son (by her) Xiao Zhangmao crown prince.  He also allowed a number of late-Liu Song officials who had opposed or been opposed by Emperor Gao, including Shen Youzhi, Yuan Can, Liu Bing, and Liu Jingsu, to be reburied with proper honors, reasoning that they were faithful officials who deserved recognition.  He largely handed important governmental matters himself, while having Wang Jian, Wang Yan, his brother Xiao Ni, and his son Xiao Ziliang as the key advisors.  However, his associates Lü Wendu, Ru Faliang, and Lü Wenxian were also powerful behind the scenes.

In 483, in what is considered a major blot on his record, Emperor Wu, still resentful that Xun Boyu had informed Emperor Gao of his misbehavior, had Xun and the general Yuan Chongzu, whom he suspected of the same and who was a friend of Xun's, put to death under false accusations of treason.  He also put to death the ambitious general Zhang Jing'er and the official Xie Chaozong.

In 485, displeased that Li Shuxian the governor of Jiao Province (交州, modern northern Vietnam) had been nominally submissive but had actually acted independently, Emperor Wu sent the general Liu Kai to attack Li.  Li, in fear, fled back to Jiankang in submission.  Later that year, Emperor Wu reestablished the national university and merged the imperial research facility Zongmingguan into it, having Wang Jian as its head.

In late 485, with the people fearful that Emperor Wu was using a new census bureau to discover cases of tax fraud and prosecute them, Tang Yuzhi rose in Fuyang and captured a number of commanderies, claiming imperial title in spring 486.  His rebellion was, however, soon suppressed.

In 487, the migrant Huan Tiansheng, who claimed to be a descendant of Huan Xuan, rose in Nanyang, with aid from Northern Wei.  However, after several months, he was defeated.

Late reign 
In 490, in response to peace overtures that Emperor Xiaowen of Northern Wei made, Emperor Wu made peace with Northern Wei.

In fall 490, Emperor Wu's son Xiao Zixiang the Prince of Badong and governor of Jing Province, who had been interested in military matters, was accused of making improper trades of weapon with barbarian tribes.  His staff members secretly informed Emperor Wu of this, and when Xiao Zixiang learned of this, he killed the staff members who reported on him.  In response, Emperor Wu sent a small detachment of soldiers under the command of general Hu Xiezhi, to force Xiao Zixiang to give up his post and return to Jiankang to receive punishment.  Hu, however, mishandled the situation as he refused all attempts by Xiao Zixiang to surrender, forcing Xiao Zixiang to engage him in battle and defeat him.  Xiao Zixiang subsequently tried to head to Jiankang alone to confess his guilt, but on the way, he was intercepted by the general Xiao Shunzhi, whom Crown Prince Zhangmao, who was fearful of Xiao Zixiang, had secretly instructed to find someway to have Xiao Zixiang killed, and Xiao Shunzhi strangled Xiao Zixiang to death.  Emperor Wu, while mourning Xiao Zixiang, publicly declared his guilt and posthumously demoted him to marquess.

In 491, in contravention with the traditional Confucian ceremonies of ancestral worship, Emperor Wu ordered that his parents (Emperor Gao and his wife Liu Zhirong) and grandparents (Emperor Gao's father Xiao Chengzhi and mother Chen Daozhi make offerings, for sacrificial purposes, items that they favored as foods, rather than the Confucian requirement of sacrificing one pig, one cow, and one goat each.  The items offered those ancestors, instead, were:

 Emperor Gao: ground pork sauce, pickled vegetable soup
 Liu Zhirong: green tea, fried dough strips, grilled fish
 Xiao Chengzhi: leavened bread, duck porridge
 Chen Daozhi: young bamboo shoots, duck eggs

Emperor Wu was heavily criticized by Confucian scholars for disobeying tradition (particularly because he also commissioned his sister-in-law, Xiao Ni's wife Princess Yu, to be in charge of the ancestral worship), but this act appeared to show quite a bit of humanity in his relationship with his parents and grandparents.

Also in 491, a project that Emperor Wu commissioned in 489—the revision of the penal statutes to eliminate contradictory provisions in the statutes written by the Jin officials Zhang Fei and Du Yu—was completed, which greatly eliminated arbitrary and unfair enforcement of the laws. However, while Emperor Wu also ordered that the national university add a department for legal studies to eliminate the issue where officials were not familiar with penal laws, the order was not actually carried out.

In 493, Crown Prince Zhangmao, to whom Emperor Wu had delegated part of imperial authority late in his reign, died.  Emperor Wu created Crown Prince Zhangmao's son, Xiao Zhaoye the Prince of Nan Commandery, as crown prince to replace his father.  Later that year, he died, and while there was initially an attempt by the official Wang Rong to have Xiao Ziliang made emperor instead, Xiao Zhaoye took the throne to succeed Emperor Wu.

The Liang Dynasty historian Xiao Zixian (Emperor Wu's nephew), in his Book of Qi, had these comments about Emperor Wu:

When Shizu [Emperor Wu's temple name] reigned, he was attentive to the important matters of state, oversaw what was important, was strict and intelligent, and resolute and decisive. He gave his commandery governors and county magistrate long office terms, and if their subordinates violated the law, he would send the imperial swords to the governors or magistrates to have them carry out the capital punishments.  Therefore, during his era of Yongming, the people were rich and peaceful, and there was little crime.  However, he also favored feasting and gaming, and while he expressed displeasure at luxuries and wastefulness, he could not avoid them himself.

Family
Consorts and Issue:
 Empress Wumu, of the Pei clan of Hedong (d. 480), personal name Huizhao
 Xiao Zhangmao, Emperor Wen (458–493), first son
 Xiao Ziliang, Prince Jingling Wenxuan (460–494), second son
 Shufei, of the Zhang clan
 Xiao Ziqing, Prince Luling (468–494), third son
 Xiao Zixiang, Marquis Yufu (469–490), fourth son
 Shuyuan, of the Ruan clan (d. 494)
 Xiao Zimao, Prince Jin'an (472–494), seventh son
 Xiao Zijun, Prince Hengyang (485–498), 18th son
 Shuyi, of the Zhou clan
 Xiao Zijing, Prince Anlu (472–494), fifth son
 Xiao Zizhen, Prince Jian'an (476–494), ninth son
 Shuyi, of the Wang clan
 Xiao Zilong, Prince Sui (474–494), eighth son
 Shuyi, of the Jiang clan
 Xiao Ziyue, Prince Linhe (485–498), 16th son
 Zhaohua, of the Xun clan
 Xiao Zilin, Prince Nankang (485–498), 19th son
 Zhaorong, of the Yu clan
 Xiao Ziwen, Prince Xiyang (485–498), tenth son
 Zhaoyi, of the Xie clan
 Xiao Zizhen, Prince Shaoling (481–495), 14th son
 Jieyu, of the Cai clan
 Xiao Ziming, Prince Xiyang (479–495), 17th son
 Jieyu, of the Yan clan
 Xiao Zimin, Prince Yongyang (485–498), 20th son
 Ronghua, of the Le clan
 Xiao Zihan, Prince Nanhai (479–495), 11th son
 Chonghua, of the Fu clan
 Xiao Zilun, Prince Baling (479–494), 13th son
 Chonghua, of the He clan
 Xiao Zixia, Prince Nan (492–498), 23rd son
 Lady, of the Xie clan
 Xiao Zijian, Prince Xiangdong (486–498), 21st son
 Unknown
 Princess Wu, first daughter
 Married Wang Guan of Langya
 Princess Changcheng, second daughter
 Married He Jingrong of Lujiang (d. 549)
 Princess Wukang, third daughter
 Married Xu Yan of Donghai (d. 499)

Ancestry

See also
Yongming poetry

References

Liu Song generals
Southern Qi emperors
440 births
493 deaths
Generals from Jiangsu